Tom Alley (21 May 1889 Metamora, Indiana – 26 March 1953 Indianapolis, Indiana) was an American racecar driver. Alley was also a riding mechanic, most notably winning the 1914 Vanderbilt Cup with Ralph DePalma.

Indianapolis 500 results

External links
Tom Alley at ChampCarStats.com

1889 births
1953 deaths
People from Franklin County, Indiana
Racing drivers from Indiana
Grand Prix drivers
Indianapolis 500 drivers
AAA Championship Car drivers